Deepdale is the stadium of Preston North End football club, in Preston, England

Deepdale may also refer to:

Places in England
 Deepdale, Preston, the area in which Deepdale stadium is located
Deepdale, Cumbria, a valley in the Yorkshire Dales National Park
Deepdale, Lincolnshire, a hamlet in North Lincolnshire
Deepdale Hoard, found in 1979
Deepdale, North Yorkshire, a hamlet in Langstrothdale in the Yorkshire Dales
 Deepdale, County Durham, a wooded side valley of Teesdale
 a former name of Dale Abbey, Derbyshire

Other
 Deepdale, Western Australia, a suburb of Geraldton
 Deepdale River, South Island, New Zealand